Nordre Land is a municipality in Innlandet county, Norway. It is located in the traditional district of Land. The administrative centre of the municipality is the village of Dokka. Other villages in the municipality include Vest-Torpa, Nord-Torpa, Aust-Torpa, Fagerlund, and Nordsinni.

The  municipality is the 122nd largest by area out of the 356 municipalities in Norway. Nordre Land is the 150th most populous municipality in Norway with a population of 6,577.

General information
The old Land Municipality was established on 1 January 1838 after the formannskapsdistrikt law went into effect. This municipality was quite large and in less than a decade, the municipality was divided. In 1847, the old Land Municipality was divided into Nordre Land (population: 4,595) in the north and Søndre Land (population: 4,604) in the south. On 1 January 1868, a part of Søndre Land (population: 340) was transferred to Nordre Land. On 1 January 1914, Nordre Land municipality was divided into two municipalities: Torpen (population: 2,219) in the north and Nordre Land (population: 2,570) in the south. During the 1960s, there were many municipal mergers across Norway due to the work of the Schei Committee. On 1 January 1962, the municipality of Nordre Land (population: 3,870) was merged with the neighboring municipality of Torpa (population: 2,620) and the Tranlia and Store Røen areas of the neighboring municipality of Fluberg (population: 196).

Name
The municipality was named after the historical district of Land which was once a petty kingdom of its own. The Old Norse form of the name was Land which means "land". In 1847, when the old Land Municipality was divided, the municipality was named Nordre Land, using the old name plus the word Nordre which means "northern", therefore the name means "(the) northern (part of) Land".

Coat of arms
The coat of arms was granted on 20 November 1987. The official blazon is "In Azure, two rising addorsed log driving hooks in Or". This means the arms have a blue field (background) and the charge is a hook for log driving. The hooks have a tincture of Or which means they are colored yellow most of the time, but if they are made out of metal, then gold is used. The blue color in the field symbolizes the local rivers and lakes. The log driving hook was chosen because of the rich local traditions of forestry and log driving, including the vast number of log dams within the area. Tools were required for the log driving, and the local blacksmiths made pike poles. Every blacksmith created his own shape or design for the poles, and one of the most famous pike poles in Nordre Land was the design made by the blacksmith Kristian Halden. In addition to pike poles he made knives. The poles and knives were named "Hæillhakar" and "Hæillakniver" by the locals. It is the "Halden Pole" which has been the model for the municipal arms of Nordre Land. The arms were designed by Dag Magne Staurheim.

Churches
The Church of Norway has four parishes within the municipality of Nordre Land. It is part of the Hadeland og Land prosti (deanery) in the Diocese of Hamar.

Geography

Nordre Land is located in the traditional district of Land. It is bordered on the north by Nord-Aurdal Municipality and Gausdal Municipality, on the northeast by Lillehammer Municipality, on the east by Gjøvik Municipality, on the south by Søndre Land Municipality, on the southwest by Sør-Aurdal Municipality, and on the west by Etnedal Municipality.

The river Etna flows from Etnedal and through western parts of the municipality down into the Randsfjorden. Lake Akksjøen is also in this area.

Government
All municipalities in Norway, including Nordre Land, are responsible for primary education (through 10th grade), outpatient health services, senior citizen services, unemployment and other social services, zoning, economic development, and municipal roads.  The municipality is governed by a municipal council of elected representatives, which in turn elects a mayor.  

The municipality falls under the Vestre Innlandet District Court and the Eidsivating Court of Appeal.

Municipal council
The municipal council  of Nordre Land is made up of 27 representatives that are elected to four year terms.  The party breakdown of the council is as follows:

Mayors
The mayors of Nordre Land since its establishment in 1847:

1847-1848: Ole Hannibal Lie
1849-1856: Arne Baggerud
1857-1861: Johannes Sollien
1862-1865: Halvard Hauk Alsing
1866-1872: Johannes Frøsaker
1872-1879: Haldor Eriksen Felde
1880-1885: Oluf Kind
1886-1887: Haldor Eriksen Felde
1888-1890: G. Andersen
1890-1910: Christian Snilsberg
1911-1918: Nikolai Lien
1919-1921: Torstein Rudi
1922-1924: Henrik Hagen
1925-1931: Torstein Rudi
1932-1944: Nils Rognerud
1946-1955: Odd Brekke (Ap)
1956-1984: Hans Christian Endrerud (Ap)
1984-1995: Nils Herman Sundby (Ap)
1996-2002: Rolf Ødegård (Ap)
2002-2004: Rolf Rønningen (Ap)
2004–2015: Liv Solveig Alfstad (Ap)
2015-present: Ola Tore Dokken (Sp)

Attractions
The rock carvings at Møllerstufossen are more than 6,000 years old. There are 11 carvings of moose, and also two that are more difficult to interpret. Sometime in the Stone Age this must have been an important place.
The Lands Museum is located in Dokka. About thirty buildings are reassembled in the area. In the main building from the Thomle farm there are rococo paintings on the walls by Peder Aadnes dating from about 1750.

Notable residents

 Jacob Sverdrup Smitt (1835–1889) politician and bishop in the Diocese of Tromsø
 Anna Rogstad (1845-1938) educator, women's rights activist and first woman elected to the Storting
 Jens Bratlie (1856–1939) an attorney, military officer and party leader
 Linn T. Sunne (born 1971) a Norwegian children's writer

Sport 
 Ole Kolterud (1903–1974) a Norwegian skier, competed at the 1928 Winter Olympics
 Sverre Kolterud (1908–1996) a Nordic combined skier, competed at the 1932 Winter Olympics
 Rune Brattsveen (born 1984) a former Norwegian biathlete

References

External links

Municipal fact sheet from Statistics Norway

 
Municipalities of Oppland
Land, Norway